François Bremer (20 January 1900 – 1960) was a Luxembourgian weightlifter. He competed in the men's middleweight event at the 1928 Summer Olympics.

References

1900 births
1960 deaths
Luxembourgian male weightlifters
Olympic weightlifters of Luxembourg
Weightlifters at the 1928 Summer Olympics
Place of birth missing